Battle of Elmina may refer to:
 Battle of Elmina (1625), during the Dutch-Portuguese War
 Battle of Elmina (1637), during the Dutch-Portuguese War
 Battle of Fort Elmina (1782), during the Fourth Anglo-Dutch War